Lisa S. Dougherty Kenna (born August 19, 1965) is the United States Ambassador to Peru since 2021. She previously served as the Executive Secretary of the United States Department of State, succeeding Joseph E. Macmanus, under President Donald Trump.

Early life and education 

Kenna is the daughter of Air Force Colonel Andrew Joseph Dougherty and Marjorie Marie (Schrader) Dougherty. Kenna studied at Middlebury College and the University of Connecticut School of Law. She worked as an attorney in private practice before joining the Central Intelligence Agency. She spent nine years with the CIA and then joined the Foreign Service.

Ukraine scandal involvement 

On October 1, 2019, a Freedom of Information Act lawsuit was issued by American Oversight, an American activist group, against the United States Department of State.  Kenna was named, along with other officials, in connection to the Trump–Ukraine scandal.  The lawsuit requested communications of various sorts between the named officials and lawyers Rudy Giuliani, Victoria Toensing, and Joseph diGenova, along with communications regarding Ukraine officials and communications regarding Marie Yovanovitch, who was the Ambassador to Ukraine until she was recalled early in May.  In the same week, text messages from former Special Representative for Ukraine, Kurt Volker, were released in a joint statement by the Intelligence, Foreign Affairs, and Oversight and Reform Committees.  In the statement was a conversation by acting Ambassador to Ukraine, Bill Taylor, and Ambassador to the European Union, Gordon Sondland, over withholding aid to Ukraine.  Sondland redirected Taylor to Kenna over concerns that Taylor held regarding the withholding.

Ambassadorship to Peru 

On May 1, 2020, President Trump announced his intent to nominate Kenna to be the next United States Ambassador to the Republic of Peru. On May 6, 2020, her nomination was sent to the Senate. On July 23, 2020, a hearing on her nomination was held before the Senate Foreign Relations Committee. On November 18, 2020, her nomination was confirmed in the United States Senate by voice vote.

Personal 

Lisa Kenna was married to Roger T. Kenna. She speaks Arabic, Persian and Urdu.

References

External links

Lisa D. Kenna at U.S. Department of State

1965 births
Living people
21st-century American diplomats
Ambassadors of the United States to Peru
American women ambassadors
Middlebury College alumni
Trump administration personnel
United States Department of State officials
University of Connecticut School of Law alumni
21st-century American women
American women diplomats